Yvonne Busch (October 18, 1929 – February 28, 2014) was a jazz musician and an influential music teacher in New Orleans.

Life and career
Born to Edward and Bertha Scott Busch in the 9th Ward of New Orleans, Busch grew up in Tremé, which had an active music scene. The local music scene piqued her interest and at age eleven, on her own initiative, she left home to pursue a music education at Piney Woods Country Life School in Mississippi. She played the trumpet and toured with the school's all-female band Swinging Rays of Rhythm, performing at dances, clubs and USO events in the American South and Midwest.

In 1943 she returned to New Orleans and continued her education at the Gilbert Academy under T. LeRoy Davis, the music director of the school. Influenced by Davis, she played multiple instruments and decided to pursue a teaching career. She enrolled in the teacher-training program at Southern University in Baton Rouge. She was the first female member and assistant director of the university's jazz band.

In 1951 upon returning to New Orleans she became a public school teacher and taught for 32 years – a year at Booker T. Washington, six years at Joseph S. Clark, and twenty five years at George Washington Carver high school. She was briefly a member of William Houston's big band, however she withdrew because of career demands. She also performed with the Dooky Chase Orchestra. As a teacher and band director she faced funding and instrument shortages and often used her own instruments and those of her acquaintances. She encouraged her students to play multiple instruments. She gave free private lessons and organized summer practice sessions for school bands. She directed large bands including marching bands. Many of her pupils went on to become notable musicians in their own right, such as Smokey Johnson, James Crawford, Herlin Riley, John Boudreaux, James Black, and Nat Perrilliat.

In 2005 her home was flooded during Hurricane Katrina. Subsequently she lived in the Dallas, Texas, area and returned to New Orleans in 2013. She died on February 28, 2014.

Busch was the subject of a 2007 documentary film titled Legend in the Classroom: The Life Story of Ms. Yvonne Busch, produced and directed by a former student and professional photographer, Leonard Smith III. In 2012 the documentary was screened as part of the inaugural Sync Up Cinema, the film component of the Sync Up Music Conference, held at the New Orleans Museum of Art and which is affiliated with the New Orleans Jazz & Heritage Festival.

References

Further reading

External links
A Legend in the Classroom – The Life Story of Ms. Yvonne Busch documentary trailer, 2008
Yvonne Busch: music moment at WWOZ radio, Archive
Yvonne Busch, musician and music educator at JazzCorner News, Archive

American jazz educators
Jazz musicians from New Orleans
African-American jazz musicians
African-American schoolteachers
Southern University alumni
1929 births
2014 deaths
Schoolteachers from Louisiana
American women music educators
20th-century African-American people
21st-century African-American people
20th-century African-American women
21st-century African-American women